Bennett, Alpert & Goldstein’s S is a statistical measure of inter-rater agreement. It was created by Bennett et al. in 1954.

Rationale for use
Bennett et al. suggested adjusting inter-rater reliability to accommodate the percentage of rater agreement that might be expected by chance was a better measure than simple agreement between raters. They proposed an index which adjusted the proportion of rater agreement based on the number of categories employed.

Mathematical formulation

The formula for S is

 

where Q is the number of categories and Pa is the proportion of agreement between raters.

The variance of S is

Notes
This statistic is also known as Guilford’s G. Guilford was the first person to use the approach extensively in the determination of inter-rater reliability.

References

Categorical variable interactions
Inter-rater reliability